Aşağı Mollu (also, Ashagy-Mollu, Ashaga Molly, and Molly) is a village in the Qubadli Rayon of Azerbaijan.

Aşağı Mollu is the Azeri village in Qubadli

References 

Populated places in Qubadli District